Dudek-e Sofla (also Romanized as Dūdek-e Soflá; also known as Dūdek and Dūdek-e Pā’īn) is a village in Poshtkuh-e Rostam Rural District, Sorna District, Rostam County, Fars Province, Iran. At the 2006 census, its population was 114, in 23 families.

References 

Populated places in Rostam County